Hong Kong Confidential may refer to:
 Hong Kong Confidential (1958 film), a film by Edward L. Cahn
 Hong Kong Confidential (2010 film), a film by Māris Martinsons